Rádio FM (styled Rádio_FM) is the fourth channel of the Slovak Radio. It is an alternative music radio and was originally created on 4 March 1991 under the name Rock FM Radio.

Rádio FM began with the tradition of awarding Radio Head Awards. Its listeners chose the best Slovak album, Single of the Year, Newcomer of the Year and Best live act of the Year and another prize is awarded also by professional music critics made up of Rádio FM and partner media editors. Through its broadcasting, it tries to discover, highlight and promote music by artists who do not receive air time on the commercial broadcasters.

History
The history of this radio station goes back to 5 January 1987, when Radio Elán was launched. On 4 September 1988, as a result of the merger of Rádia Elán and the Czech Mikrofórum, the E + M program was created, which lasted until 31 December 1990. On 4 March 1991, Rock FM Rádio was established. It was the first radio in Slovakia to start 24-hour broadcasting. On 3 November 2004, the station changed its name to Rádio_FM.

It was the ninth most listened radio station in Slovakia in the 2nd and 3rd quarters of 2017, with a listening rate of 2.56%, according to the Market & Media & Lifestyle survey by Median SK.

Programming
The specific feature of Rádio FM is its focus on young listeners who avoid consumer musical production and are interested in alternative music genres such as indie rock, dubstep, hip-hop, world music, drum and bass, UK grime, metal, dance electronic music, R&B and so on. The radio also broadcasts radio coverage from festivals, live 'unplugged' performances and concerts. They have also broadcast the final of the Eurovision Song Contest since Slovakia's withdrawal from the contest in 2013.

Radio Head Awards
Rádio FM began the tradition of awarding “radio heads” in 2009 when its listeners chose the best Slovak album of the year and another prize was awarded also by professional music critics. In the same year, the fourth channel of Slovak Radio introduced also a visual aspect by awarding statuettes. It was a tradition that the winners get a piece of work created by the artist Bety K. Majerníkova – a statuette with radio instead of the head. On 6 February 2009, the electro band Noisecut became the first winner of the Radio_Head Awards for the album Bliiizko and songwriter Ján Boleslav Kladivo received the critics' choice award for his album Rozhľadňa.

The attractiveness of music awards and their increasing popularity brought some significant changes into the second edition. Next Radio_Head Awards brought three new categories added to the original award for Album of the Year and Album of the Year/Critics choice. In two voting rounds the listeners chose their favorites in the new categories Single of the Year, Newcomer of the Year and Best live act. Vetroplach and young band Billy Barman were the winners of the second edition and the main award went to the band Diego for their album Peripheries. The critics´ choice went to the electronic project The Autumnist. The gala evening was hosted by the moderators Baláž and Hubinák from the most favourite show of Rádio FM and ten bands performed live on stage.

The third edition of Radio_Head Awards took place on 18 February 2011 in public.

Media
Rádio FM is one of the pioneers in podcasting technology and mobile phone applications on the Slovak media market and also makes strong use of the potential of social network communities such as Facebook or Twitter.

Frequencies

Slovak Radio broadcasts on frequencies with a note at the time from 6:00 to 18:00 (SRo 5) Radio Patria programme in Hungarian.

Also available on satellite:
 Astra 3B, position: 23,5° E, frequency: 11836/H, SR: 27500, FEC: 5/6, standard: DVB-S, encryption: none

References

External links
 

Publicly funded broadcasters
Radio stations in Slovakia
Radio and Television of Slovakia